Whenuakura is a farming community on State Highway 3 east of Patea, at the southern end of Taranaki on the North Island of New Zealand. The boundary between the Taranaki and Wellington provinces runs through Whenuakura. There is the Whenuakura Primary School and Whenuakura Hall. Whenuakura is also bounded by the Patea and Whenuakura rivers.

The population of the Whenuakura statistical area was 1,065 in the 2013 Census, an increase of 66 from 2006. The statistical area covers a large area to the northeast of Patea and not just the Whenuakura locality.

The New Zealand golfer Michael Campbell, winner of the 2005 US Open, descends from these iwi. He spent his early childhood at Whenuakura and learned to play golf at the Patea Golf Club about 8 km to the west.

Marae

Whenuakura Pā near the Whenuakura River bridge is the pā marae of the Kairakau and Pamatangi hapū. Families at this pā descend from Nga Rauru, Ngati Ruanui or Ngāti Hine. All descend from Rangitawhi and Aotea waka. The pā includes the Matangirei meeting house.

In October 2020, the Government committed $229,345 from the Provincial Growth Fund to upgrade the marae, creating 8 jobs.

Education

Whenuakura School is a coeducational contributing primary (years 1–6) school with a roll of 45. The school celebrated 125 years of education in the district in 2002.

References

South Taranaki District
Populated places in Taranaki